The 2011–12 NBA Development League season is the 11th season of the NBA Development League (NBA D-League). The NBA D-League is the official minor league basketball organization owned and run by the National Basketball Association (NBA). The league was formed in 2001 as the National Basketball Development League (NBDL). The league adopted its current name in 2005 to reflect its close affiliation with the NBA. The 2011–12 season will be competed by 16 teams. The Los Angeles D-Fenders, after spending one season inactive, joined the 15 returning teams from the previous season. The Utah Flash ceased operation at the end of the previous season and would not be playing in the 2011–12 season. The New Mexico Thunderbirds relocated to Canton, Ohio and were renamed as the Canton Charge.

This season, an all-time high nine teams will have single-affiliation partnerships with NBA teams, up from four in the previous season. Five of them, the Austin Toros, the Canton Charge, the Dakota Wizards, the Los Angeles D-Fenders and the Tulsa 66ers, are owned by their NBA affiliates. Four teams, the Erie BayHawks, the Rio Grande Valley Vipers, the Springfield Armor and the Texas Legends, have a hybrid single-affiliation partnership with NBA teams, where their basketball operations are controlled by their NBA affiliates. The other seven teams are affiliated with three NBA teams each.

Teams and coaches

Team changes
On May 1, 2011, the Springfield Armor began a single-affiliation partnership with the New Jersey Nets. The Armor's basketball operation will be controlled by the Nets, who also became their sole NBA affiliate.
On June 8, 2011, the Erie BayHawks began a single-affiliation partnership with the New York Knicks. The BayHawks' basketball operation will be controlled by the Knicks, who also became their sole NBA affiliate.
On June 9, 2011, the Los Angeles D-Fenders, who suspended operation during the 2010–11 season, announced that they will return to play in the 2011–12 season. The franchise, which is owned and operated by the Los Angeles Lakers, relocated to El Segundo, California and resumed their single-affiliation partnership with the Lakers.
On June 18, 2011, the Utah Flash announced that they would not play in the 2011–12 season as the team is up for sale.
On June 28, 2011, the Dakota Wizards was purchased by the Golden State Warriors. The Wizards also began a single-affiliation partnership with the Warriors.
On July 7, 2011, the New Mexico Thunderbirds was purchased by the Cleveland Cavaliers. The franchise relocated to Canton, Ohio and were later renamed as the Canton Charge. The Charge also began a single-affiliation partnership with the Cavaliers.

Affiliation changes
On July 7, 2011, the league announced the affiliation system for the season. Five teams, the Austin Toros, the Rio Grande Valley Vipers, the Texas Legends and the Tulsa 66ers, continued their single-affiliation partnerships with their parent teams. The Los Angeles D-Fenders, who returned after one-year hiatus, resumed their single-affiliation partnership with the Los Angeles Lakers. Four teams, the Canton Charge, the Dakota Wizards and the Erie BayHawks, each began a single-affiliation partnership with an NBA team. The Springfield Armor also began a single-affiliation partnership with the New Jersey Nets, their NBA affiliate for last two seasons. The other seven teams are affiliated with three NBA teams each. Only one team, the Fort Wayne Mad Ants, retained the same affiliates from the previous season. Due to several team changes above and other circumstances, some affiliation changes occurred.

Coaching changes

Offseason
On July 21, 2011, the Maine Red Claws hired former college coach Dave Leitao as the team's head coach, replacing Austin Ainge who was hired as the Director of Player Personnel for the Boston Celtics on May 13, 2011.
On August 3, 2011, the Dakota Wizards hired Iowa Energy assistant coach Nate Bjorkgren as the team's head coach, replacing Rory White who left the team after the 2010–11 season.
On August 18, 2011, the Los Angeles D-Fenders hired Reno Bighorns head coach Eric Musselman as the team's head coach.
On September 14, 2011, the Springfield Armor hired former Colorado 14ers and Idaho Stampede head coach Bob MacKinnon, Jr. as the team's head coach, replacing Dee Brown who was hired as the assistant coach for the Detroit Pistons.
On September 19, 2011, the Rio Grande Valley Vipers hired Iowa Energy head coach Nick Nurse as the team's head coach, replacing Chris Finch who was hired as the assistant coach for the Houston Rockets on July 15, 2011.
On September 29, 2011, the Reno Bighorns hired Rio Grande Valley Vipers assistant coach Paul Mokeski as the team's head coach, replacing Eric Musselman who was hired as the head coach for the Los Angeles D-Fenders on August 18, 2011.
On October 4, 2011, the Texas Legends hired former NBA head coach Del Harris as the team's head coach, replacing Nancy Lieberman who was promoted to the front office as the Assistant General Manager for the Legends on July 18, 2011.
On October 5, 2011, the Iowa Energy hired former Utah Flash head coach Kevin Young as the team's head coach, replacing Nick Nurse who was hired as the head coach for the Rio Grande Valley Vipers on September 19.
On October 11, 2011, the Canton Charge hired former college assistant coach Alex Jensen as the team's head coach.

In-season
On December 5, 2011, the Tulsa 66ers promoted assistant coach Dale Osbourne, replacing Nate Tibbets who was hired as the assistant coach for the Cleveland Cavaliers.
On January 6, 2012, the Fort Wayne Mad Ants fired Joey Meyer and promoted assistant coach Steve Gansey to interim head coach.

Players
An NBA D-League team roster consists of draftees, returning, allocation and tryout players. In addition, NBA teams can assign players who are on their first or second NBA season to their D-League affiliates. The roster must consist of 10 D-League players, but the maximum roster size is 12 players, including NBA assignees. If a team had more than two NBA assignees, the team must reduce its roster to avoid having more than 12 players. In the D-League, all players sign a one-year NBA D-League Standard Player Contract with the league, not with the specific D-League teams.

Returning players are players who played in the league during the previous season and are retained by their respective teams. The D-League teams are allowed to invite a limited number of returning players. Players who signed a D-League contract but are not retained by their previous teams are placed on the draft pool, along with new players who also sign with the league. Tryout players are the players who are invited to join the D-League team from the open tryouts which are held by each teams in October, before the season began.

Draft
The eleventh annual NBA Development League Draft was held on November 3, 2011. In this draft, all 16 teams took turns selecting eligible players for their roster. Former NBA first-round draft pick and eight-year NBA veteran Jamaal Tinsley was selected first by the Los Angeles D-Fenders. Another former NBA first-round pick Alando Tucker was selected second by the Texas Legends. Former NBA second-round pick Gabe Pruitt was also selected in the first-round. Other notable picks in the later rounds are former NBA players Cedric Bozeman and Chris Taft who were selected in the second and fourth round respectively. 18 players selected in the draft were participants of the NBA D-League National Tryouts that were held in June. A total of 127 players were selected in the eight-round draft.

Assignments

Each NBA team can assign players with two years or less of experience to its affiliated NBA Development League team. Players with more than two years of experience may be assigned to the D-League with the players' consent.

Call-ups

A call-up occurs when a player is signed by an NBA team. An NBA team is allowed to sign any D-League player as long as they are eligible to play in the NBA under the current Collective Bargaining Agreement (CBA). However, an NBA team could not call-up a player whose draft rights are still held by other NBA teams. A D-League player is usually signed to a 10-day contracts, a short term contract which lasted ten days and are available to be used starting February 6. A player can only sign two 10-day contracts with the same team in one season. If the team want to retain the player after the second 10-day contract expired, the team has to sign the player for the remainder of the season.

Due to the 2011 NBA lockout, the D-League season started earlier than the NBA season. Therefore, the NBA training camps, which are usually attended by a number of D-League players to compete for a spot on NBA roster, started on December 9, three weeks after the D-League season started. A total of 62 D-League players left their teams to attend NBA training camps. Eleven of them made the NBA opening day roster on December 25 and therefore they are considered as NBA call-ups.

As of April 6, 2012, there has been 49 call-ups, involving 33 different players. 22 of them are still on the NBA roster, although 6 of them are currently on 10-day contracts. The Los Angeles D-Fenders and the Austin Toros have the most players called up with five players, while the Erie BayHawks each has four players called up. Mike James received the most call-ups with four, all of them to the Chicago Bulls. Two players, Mickell Gladness and Donald Sloan, has been called up three times. Gladness was called up by the Miami Heat (twice) and the Golden State Warriors, while Sloan was called up to three different NBA teams, the Atlanta Hawks, the Cleveland Cavaliers and the New Orleans Hornets.

Note
Number in parentheses indicates the number of call-ups a player has received during the season.
Asterisk (*) indicates team affiliation

Regular season

Showcase
The eighth annual NBA D-League Showcase was held at the Reno Events Center in Reno, Nevada from January 9 until January 12, 2012. The event featured every D-League team who played two games each over a four-day schedule. The games were attended by the professional scouts from all NBA teams. The event was designed to allow the NBA teams to evaluate the D-League's prospects for future call-ups.

Standings

Eastern Conference

Western Conference

Notes
x indicates teams that have qualified for the playoff

Statistics leaders

All-Star Weekend

All-Star Game
The sixth annual NBA D-League All-Star Game was held during the 2012 NBA All-Star Weekend in Orlando, Florida. The game was played in the Orange County Convention Center on February 25. The Western Conference All-Stars defeated the Eastern Conference All-Stars 135–126, led by forward Gerald Green of the Los Angeles D-Fenders. Green scored a game-high 28 points and was named as the MVP of the game.

Dream Factory Friday Night
The fifth annual NBA D-League Dream Factory Friday Night was held on February 25 during the 2012 NBA All-Star Weekend. The events included a slam dunk contest, a three-point shooting contest and a shooting stars competition, all of which are also annual competitions in the NBA All-Star Saturday Night. In the Slam Dunk Contest, reigning champion L.D. Williams of the Springfield Armor retained the title after defeating Texas Legends center Chris Douglas-Roberts in the final round with a score of 93–90. Another player who won again was Legends guard Booker Woodfox in the Three-Point Contest. The Shooting Stars Competition was won by the team of Marqus Blakely (Sioux Falls), Jery Smith (Springfield) and Cameron Jones (Fort Wayne).

Playoffs

Notes
The numbers to the left of each team indicate the team's seeding.
The numbers to the right indicate the number of games the team won in that round.
The conference champions are marked by an asterisk (*).
Teams in bold advanced to the next round.
Teams in italics have home-court advantage in that round.

Awards and honors

Most Valuable Player: Justin Dentmon (Austin Toros)
Coach of the Year: Eric Musselman (Los Angeles D-Fenders)
Rookie of the Year: Edwin Ubiles (Dakota Wizards)
Defensive Player of the Year: Stefhon Hannah (Dakota Wizards)
Impact Player of the Year: Eric Dawson (Austin Toros)
Most Improved Player: Kenny Hayes (Maine Red Claws)
Executive of the Year:
Sportsmanship Award: Moses Ehambe (Iowa Energy)
All-NBA D-League Team:
First Team:
G Justin Dentmon (Austin Toros)
G Blake Ahearn (Reno Bighorns)
F Edwin Ubiles (Dakota Wizards)
F Malcolm Thomas (Los Angeles D-Fenders)
C Greg Smith (Rio Grande Valley Vipers)
Second Team:
G Elijah Millsap (Los Angeles D-Fenders)
G Courtney Fortson (Los Angeles D-Fenders)
F Marcus Lewis (Tulsa 66ers)
F Eric Dawson (Austin Toros)
C Jeff Foote (Springfield Armor)
Third Team:
G Morris Almond (Maine Red Claws)
G Jerry Smith (Springfield Armor)
F Brandon Costner (Los Angeles D-Fenders)
F Dennis Horner (Springfield Armor)
C Sean Williams (Texas Legends)
All-Rookie Team:
First Team:
G Dwight Buycks (Tulsa 66ers)
G Cameron Jones (Fort Wayne Mad Ants)
F Edwin Ubiles (Dakota Wizards)
F Malcolm Thomas (Los Angeles D-Fenders)
C Greg Smith (Rio Grande Valley Vipers)
Second Team:
G Mustapha Farrakhan (Bakersfield Jam)
G Kyle Gibson (Canton Charge)
F D.J. Kennedy (Erie BayHawks)
F Mychel Thompson (Erie BayHawks)
C Jamie Vanderbeken (Bakersfield Jam)
All-Defensive Team:
First Team:
G Stefhon Hannah (Dakota Wizards)
G Jerry Smith (Springfield Armor)
F Marcus Dove (Dakota Wizards)
F Malcolm Thomas (Los Angeles D-Fenders)
C Sean Williams (Texas Legends) 
Second Team:
G Jerome Dyson (Tulsa 66ers)
G Courtney Fortson (Los Angeles D-Fenders)
F Marcus Lewis (Tulsa 66ers)
F Larry Owens (Tulsa 66ers)
C Mikki Moore (Idaho Stampede)
Player of the Month:
December: Brandon Costner (Los Angeles D-Fenders)
January: Justin Dentmon (Austin Toros)
February: Jerry Smith (Springfield Armor)
March: Jamario Moon (Los Angeles D-Fenders)
Performers of the Week:
November 25–December 4: Walker Russell, Jr. (Fort Wayne Mad Ants)
December 5–11: Brandon Costner (Los Angeles D-Fenders)
December 12–18: Stanley Asumnu (Rio Grande Valley Vipers)
December 19–25: Anthony Mason, Jr. (Sioux Falls Skyforce)
December 26–January 1: Blake Ahearn and Andre Emmett (both Reno Bighorns)
January 2–8: Not awarded
January 9–15: Justin Dentmon (Austin Toros)
January 16–22: Ben Uzoh (Rio Grande Valley Vipers)
January 23–29: Manny Harris (Canton Charge)
January 30–February 5: Jerry Smith (Springfield Armor)
February 6–12: Gerald Green (Los Angeles D-Fenders)
February 13–19: Manny Harris (Canton Charge)
February 20–26: Not awarded (All-Star break)
February 27–March 4: Morris Almond and Kenny Hayes (both Maine Red Claws)
March 5–11: Luke Harangody (Canton Charge) and Donald Sloan (Erie BayHawks)
March 12–18: Marqus Blakely (Sioux Falls Skyforce) and Brian Butch (Bakersfield Jam)
March 19–25: Cory Joseph (Austin Toros)
March 26–April 1: Stefhon Hannah (Dakota Wizards)
April 2–7: Elijah Millsap (Los Angeles D-Fenders)

References
General

Specific

External links
Official site
Playoffs homepage